John Rupert "Choppy" Rhodes (February 6, 1903 – May 24, 1951) was an American football and baseball player, track athlete, coach of football and baseball, and college athletics administrator.  He served as the head football coach at the University of Wyoming from 1930 to 1932, compiling a record of 10–15–2.  He was also Wyoming's athletic director at the time.  Rhodes played football and baseball and ran track at the University of Nebraska–Lincoln.  He was the head baseball coach at his alma mater, Nebraska, from 1929 to 1930, tallying a mark of 21–12–1.

Rhodes was a native of Ansley, Nebraska.  He coached high school football at the Blair High School in Blair, Nebraska in 1938, 1941, and 1942. Rhodes died of a heart ailment on May 24, 1951, at his home in Spalding, Nebraska.

Head coaching record

College football

References

External links
 

1903 births
1951 deaths
American football halfbacks
Nebraska Cornhuskers baseball coaches
Nebraska Cornhuskers baseball players
Nebraska Cornhuskers football coaches
Nebraska Cornhuskers football players
Nebraska Cornhuskers men's track and field athletes
St. Louis Gunners coaches
Wyoming Cowboys and Cowgirls athletic directors
Wyoming Cowboys football coaches
High school football coaches in Nebraska
People from Custer County, Nebraska
People from Spalding, Nebraska
Coaches of American football from Nebraska
Players of American football from Nebraska
Baseball coaches from Nebraska
Baseball players from Nebraska